Karel Knesl (8 April 1942 – 3 September 2020) was a Czech football player who competed in the 1964 Summer Olympics.

Knesl died in Prague on 3 September 2020, at the age of 78.

References

External links
 
 

1942 births
2020 deaths
Czechoslovak footballers
Czechoslovakia international footballers
Olympic footballers of Czechoslovakia
Olympic silver medalists for Czechoslovakia
Olympic medalists in football
Footballers at the 1964 Summer Olympics
Medalists at the 1964 Summer Olympics
SK Slavia Prague players
Dukla Prague footballers
FC Viktoria Plzeň players
Association football midfielders
People from Vyškov District
Czech footballers
Sportspeople from the South Moravian Region